Lake Napalit is a small tectonic lake located in the mountains of central Bukidnon province in the Philippines. It is situated just outside the Kalatungan Mountain Range.

References

Napalit
Landforms of Bukidnon